24th Regiment may refer to:

Infantry regiments
 24th Regiment of Foot, a unit of the British Army
 24th Regiment of Bengal Native Infantry, a unit of the British Army
 24th Punjabis, a unit of the British Army
 24th Infantry Regiment (United States), a unit of the United States Army
 24th Marine Regiment (United States), a unit of the United States Army
 24th Arkansas Infantry Regiment, a unit of the United States Army
 24th Indiana Infantry Regiment, a unit of the United States Army
 24th Tennessee Infantry Regiment, a unit of the United States Army
 24th Connecticut Infantry Regiment, a unit of the United States Army
 19th and 24th Consolidated Arkansas Infantry Regiment, a unit of the United States Army
 24th Wisconsin Volunteer Infantry Regiment, a unit of the United States Army
 24th New York Volunteer Infantry Regiment, a unit of the United States Army
 24th Michigan Volunteer Infantry Regiment, a unit of the United States Army
 24th Iowa Volunteer Infantry Regiment, a unit of the United States Army
 24th Illinois Volunteer Infantry Regiment, a unit of the United States Army

Cavalry regiments
 24th Regiment of (Light) Dragoons, a unit of the British Army
 24th Regiment Grey's Horse, a former unit of Canadian Army 1908 to 1936

Engineering regiments
 24 Commando Regiment (United Kingdom), a unit of the British Army's Royal Engineers

Artillery regiments
 24th Field Artillery Regiment (Canada), a unit of the Canadian Army
 24th Field Artillery Regiment (United States), a unit of the United States Army